Payload is the second extended play by Australian rock music group, Hunters & Collectors, which was issued on 29 November 1982. It was co-produced by the group and Mike Howlett; and reached No. 31 on the New Zealand Singles Chart but did not reach the top 100 in Australia. Its lead single, "Lumps of Lead", was also released in November but did not chart in either Australia or New Zealand despite a music video by film maker, Richard Lowenstein.

Background 
Payload is a four-track extended play released by Australian rock group, Hunters & Collectors, in November 1982. The group had formed in the previous year and by mid-1982 consisted of John Archer on bass guitar; Geoff Crosby on keyboards; Doug Falconer on drums; Robert Miles as live sound and art director; Greg Perano on percussion; Mark Seymour on guitar and lead vocals; and newly joined Martin Lubran on guitar. Their brass section, Horns of Contempt, consisted of Jack Howard on trumpet, Jeremy Smith on French horn, and Michael Waters on trombone.

The EP was co-produced by fellow Australian Mike Howlett, a former member of the band Gong, and the group. In February it reached No. 31 on the New Zealand Singles Chart, but it did not reach the top 100 on the Australian Kent Music Report Singles Chart. Film maker, Richard Lowenstein, directed the music video for the lead single, "Lumps of Lead", but it did not chart in Australia or New Zealand. In 1983 the band toured the United Kingdom for six months and signed with Virgin Records. The label compiled three tracks from the band's debut album, Hunters & Collectors (July 1982), and all four tracks from Payload into an album also called Hunters & Collectors, which was released in April 1983. A three-record deal with Virgin was broken when band members insulted the label's executive, Simon Draper, by telling him that he was "a poncy little blueblood" with no faith in them.

Track listing

Charts

Personnel 
Credited to:

Hunters & Collectors members
 John Archer – bass guitar, backing vocals
 Geoff Crosby – keyboards, Korg MS-20
 Doug Falconer – drums
 Martin Lubran – guitar
 Robert Miles – live sound, art director
 Greg Perano – percussion
 Mark Seymour – guitar, lead vocals

Horns of Contempt members
 Jack Howard – trumpet
 Jeremy Smith – French horn
 Michael Waters – trombone

Additional musicians
 Karen Ansel, Christine Bodey, Margot Dual, La-Chelle Gera – backing vocals on "Drop Tank"

Production details
 Producer – Mike Howlett, Hunters & Collectors
 Engineer – Christo Curtis, Jim Barton
 Studio – AAV Studios, Melbourne (recording); Studios 301, Sydney (mixing)
 Cover art – Robert Miles

References 

Hunters & Collectors albums
1982 EPs
albums produced by Mike Howlett